Caloptilia garcinicola is a moth of the family Gracillariidae. It is known from China (Guangxi).

The larvae feed on Garcinia tinctoria. They mine the leaves of their host plant.

References

garcinicola
Moths of Asia
Moths described in 1990